Judge Nichols may refer to:

Carl J. Nichols (born 1970), judge of the United States District Court for the District of Columbia
Philip Nichols Jr. (1907–1990), judge of the United States Court of Appeals for the Federal Circuit

See also
Fred Joseph Nichol (1912–1996), judge of the United States District Court for the District of South Dakota
John Cochran Nicoll (1793–1863), judge of the United States District Courts for the District of Georgia and the Northern and Southern Districts of Georgia